Brighouse and Spenborough was a parliamentary constituency in the West Riding of Yorkshire, comprising the two municipal boroughs of Brighouse and Spenborough and neighbouring areas.  It returned one Member of Parliament (MP)  to the House of Commons of the Parliament of the United Kingdom.

Boundaries
1950–1955: The Borough of Brighouse, and the Urban Districts of Queensberry and Shelf, and Spenborough.

1955–1983: The Borough of Brighouse, the Urban District of Heckmondwike, and the Urban District of Spenborough (a borough from 29 July 1955).

History
The constituency was created for the 1950 general election. The boundaries were redrawn for the 1955 general election: Queensbury and Shelf Urban District was transferred to Bradford South while Heckmondwike Urban District was added to this seat from the pre-1955 Dewsbury. These boundaries were used until the constituency's abolition for the 1983 general election.

In 1983 parliamentary seats were reorganised to reflect the changes in local government introduced in 1974. The area had become part of the Metropolitan County of West Yorkshire and was divided between two new constituencies: Batley and Spen (including Heckmondwike and Spenborough) and Calder Valley (including Brighouse).  This seat's last MP, the Conservative Gary Waller, moved to the redrawn Keighley constituency, which he held until 1997.

Members of Parliament

Elections

Elections in the 1950s

Elections in the 1960s

Elections in the 1970s

References

Parliamentary constituencies in Yorkshire and the Humber (historic)
Constituencies of the Parliament of the United Kingdom established in 1950
Constituencies of the Parliament of the United Kingdom disestablished in 1983
Politics of Calderdale
Politics of Kirklees